Kolvereid is a former municipality in the old Nord-Trøndelag county, Norway. The  municipality existed from 1838 until its dissolution in 1964. The municipality encompassed the central part of what is now the municipality of Nærøysund in Trøndelag county. The municipality included both sides of the central part of the Folda fjord. The administrative centre was the village of Kolvereid where the Kolvereid Church is located.

History

The municipality of Kolvereid was established on 1 January 1838 (see formannskapsdistrikt). In 1860, the northern islands and coastal area of Kolvereid (population: 1,702) was separated to become the new municipality of Leka. Then on 1 October 1886, the northeastern part of the municipality (population: 948) surrounding the innermost parts of the Foldafjord was separated to become the new municipality of Foldereid. This left Kolvereid with 1,716 residents. On 1 January 1902, an unpopulated part of Kolvereid was transferred to the neighboring municipality of Nærøy.

During the 1960s, there were many municipal mergers across Norway due to the work of the Schei Committee. On 1 January 1964, the municipality of Kolvereid (population: 2,426) was merged with the neighboring municipalities of Nærøy (population: 2,182), Gravvik (population: 816), and the western two-thirds of Foldereid to form the new, larger municipality of Nærøy.

Name
The municipality (originally the parish) is named after the old Kolvereid farm since the first Kolvereid Church was built there. The meaning of the first element is uncertain, but it could come from the word  which means "bell clapper". This may have been the old name for the local fjord, now called the Kolvereidvågen, or it could have been named after a nearby mountain.

Government
While it existed, this municipality was responsible for primary education (through 10th grade), outpatient health services, senior citizen services, unemployment, social services, zoning, economic development, and municipal roads. During its existence, this municipality was governed by a municipal council of elected representatives, which in turn elected a mayor.

Municipal council
The municipal council  of Kolvereid was made up of representatives that were elected to four year terms. The party breakdown of the final municipal council was as follows:

Mayors
The mayors of Kolvereid:

 1838–1839: Fredrik Christian Grevenkopf Lied 
 1840–1843: Henrik Støren 
 1844–1847: Johan August Buchholdt 
 1848–1849: Henrik Støren 
 1850–1851: Nicolaus Selliseth 
 1852–1853: H.J. Gansmo 
 1854–1855: Nicolaus Selliseth
 1856–1857: Olaus Berg
 1858-1859: Knut Thorkelsen
 1860–1861: H.J. Gansmo 
 1862–1865: Sivert Moe 
 1866–1869: Knut Thorkelsen
 1870–1873: Mikal Evensen
 1874–1877: Erik Herlaugsen Lien 
 1878–1885: Vilhelm Andreas Wexelsen (V)
 1886–1889: Adolf Sverdrup (H)
 1890–1893: Ingebrigt Gudbrandsen (H)
 1894–1898: Adolf Sverdrup (H)
 1899–1904: Christian Wendelbo Strand (H)
 1905–1913: Jakob Sverdrup (H)
 1914–1919: Nils Trædal (V)
 1919–1920: Johan A. Lund (V)
 1920–1934: Torgeir P. Lund (V)
 1935–1938: Vilhelm Flotvik (Ap)
 1938–1945: Jens Kruse (Bp)
 1945-1945: Fredrik Eidshaug (V)
 1946–1963: Arne Fagernes (Ap)

See also
List of former municipalities of Norway

References

Nærøysund
Nærøy
Former municipalities of Norway
1838 establishments in Norway
1964 disestablishments in Norway